The Nepton River is a tributary of Chibougamau Lake, flowing into the Municipality of Eeyou Istchee James Bay, in Jamésie, in the administrative region of Nord-du-Québec, in the province of Quebec, in Canada.

The course of the river flows entirely into McCorkill Township.

The hydrographic slope of the Nepton River is accessible by a forest road serving the eastern side of Chibougamau Lake; the latter is connected by the North to route 167 which also serves the south side of Waconichi Lake and the Waconichi River. This last road comes from Chibougamau, going north-east to the south-eastern part of Mistassini Lake.

The surface of the Nepton River is usually frozen from early November to mid-May, however, safe ice movement is generally from mid-November to mid-April.

Geography

Toponymy 
The toponym "Nepton River" was formalized on December 5, 1968, at the Commission de toponymie du Québec, that is to say, the foundation of this commission.

References

See also 

Rivers of Nord-du-Québec
Nottaway River drainage basin
Eeyou Istchee James Bay